Conus felix is a species of sea snail, a marine gastropod mollusc in the family Conidae, the cone snails, cone shells or cones.

These snails are predatory and venomous. They are capable of "stinging" humans.

Description
The size of the shell varies between 25 mm and 35 mm.

Distribution
This marine species of cone snail occurs in the Indian Ocean off KwaZulu-Natal, South Africa

References

 Fenzan W.J. (2012) A new species of Conus from South Africa (Gastropoda: Conidae). Acta Conchyliorum 11: 11-15
 Puillandre N., Duda T.F., Meyer C., Olivera B.M. & Bouchet P. (2015). One, four or 100 genera? A new classification of the cone snails. Journal of Molluscan Studies. 81: 1-23

External links
 To World Register of Marine Species
 Cone Shells - Knights of the Sea
 
 Holotype in MNHN, Paris

Endemic fauna of South Africa
felix
Gastropods described in 2012